The Treaty of Washington (1831) was a treaty between the Menominee (an American Indian tribe) and the United States Government. During the ratification of the treaty in June 1832, the United States Senate modified the treaty to provide additional land for the Stockbridge-Munsee tribe. The Menominee Tribe did not agree to the changes, and the treaty was renegotiated on October 27, 1832 to resolve the differences. These two treaties are commonly referred to singularly as the Treaty of Washington.

Initial treaty
The treaty was first brought about by Colonel Samuel C. Stambaugh, the Indian agent at Green Bay. The principal Menonminee Chief was Oshkosh, who did not attend the treaty negotiation due to his belief that without his presence, the treaty would not be binding on the tribe. The head chief that attended the talks for the tribe was Iometah, who was shown signing the treaty as Aya-mah-taw, while the United States was represented by John H. Eaton, the Secretary of War. The negotiations concluded on February 8, 1831, ceding  to the United States in return for clothing, provisions and annuities totaling approximately US$92,000.

In the winter of 1831, a group of Indians including Oneida chief Daniel Bread travelled to Washington to protest the treaty, which had bypassed the interests of the Oneida people. President Andrew Jackson agreed to adjust the assignment of lands to the Oneida in response.

Ratification and second treaty
In June 1832 the treaty was ratified by the United States Senate.  The Stockbridge-Munsee tribe was unhappy with the treaty as it was written, and had lobbied the New York senators to amend the treaty.  The Senate did so, and George B. Porter, the Governor of the Michigan Territory was directed to gain the consent of the Menominee tribe to the changes.  The tribe refused to agree to the changes, and a subsequent treaty was negotiated, being signed on October 27, 1832.  After the modifications were negotiated and agreed to by both tribes and the United States, the treaty was again submitted to the Senate and ratified in 1833.  Collectively both treaties are referred to as the singular "Treaty of Washington."

See also
 Treaty of the Cedars (1836)

References

External links
Ratified Indian Treaty 161: Menominee - Washington, DC, February 8, 1831, National Archives
Printed Copy of the February 8, 1831, Treaty Between the United States and the Menominee Indians, National Archives
Supplementary Articles to the February 8, 1831 Treaty Between the United States and the Menominee Indians Signed at Washington, DC, National Archives
Treaty Between the United States and the Menominee Indians Signed at Washington, DC, with Signed Note Regarding First Article, National Archives

Menominee people
Washington
Native American history of Wisconsin
1831 treaties
1831 in the United States
1830s in Wisconsin Territory
February 1831 events